The 2003 Nationwide Tour season ran from February 27 to November 2. The season consisted of 26 official money golf tournaments in the United States and four elsewhere. The top 20 players on the year-end money list earned their PGA Tour card for 2004.

Schedule
The following table lists official events during the 2003 season.

Money leaders
For full rankings, see 2003 Nationwide Tour graduates.

The money list was based on prize money won during the season, calculated in U.S. dollars. The top 20 players on the tour earned status to play on the 2004 PGA Tour.

Awards

See also
2003 Nationwide Tour graduates

Notes

References

External links
Schedule

Korn Ferry Tour seasons
Nationwide Tour